The Witrand Cricket Field is a cricket ground in Potchefstroom, South Africa. It has hosted senior cricket irregularly since 1991, when Western Transvaal hosted Western Province. In 2010, it was one of three venues used for the ICC Women's Cricket Challenge.

The cricket field is situated within the grounds of the Witrand Psychiatric Hospital, just west of the North-West University, in Potchefstroom.

References

Cricket grounds in South Africa
Sports venues in North West (South African province)